John Pierce Jones (born 10 May 1946) is a Welsh actor.

Career 
Jones is best known for his role as Arthur Picton in the Welsh language sitcom C'Mon Midffild!  He has also appeared in the Only Fools and Horses episode "The Miracle of Peckham" as Biffo and the Blackadder episode "Money" as Arthur the Sailor.

Personal life 
He is married to American Inge Hansen, who has learned Welsh, and they adopted a son from Haiti in 2004.

References

External links 

1946 births
Living people
Welsh male television actors
Place of birth missing (living people)